The 2015 season was Sarawak's 3rd season in Liga Super the top tier of Malaysian football since being promoted in 2012. Ngap Sayot finished the season in 10th position since ATM and Sime Darby seems incompetent throughout the season. In domestic cup campaign the team went out early after loss to eventual finalist, kelantan in first round of FA cup and surprisingly passes the group stage of Piala Malaysia but loss with aggregate 2–3 to eventual winner, Selangor in quarterfinal.

Players

First-team squad

References

Sarawak FA seasons
Malaysian football clubs 2015 season